The Danville Community School Corporation is a school district located in Danville, Hendricks County, Indiana. It consists of North Elementary (Pre-K to 2nd grade), South Elementary (3rd grade to 4th grade), Danville Community Middle School (5th grade to 8th grade), and Danville Community High School (9th grade to 12th grade). The high school's mascot is the Warrior.

Having closed as a response to the COVID-19 pandemic, Danville is set to reopen its schools on August 13, 2020.

References

External links
 

School districts in Indiana
Education in Hendricks County, Indiana